A Thief of Time is the eighth crime fiction novel Joe Leaphorn / Jim Chee Navajo Tribal Police series by Tony Hillerman, first published in 1988. It was adapted for television as part of the PBS Mystery! series in 2004.

The story involves the lure of the thousand-year-old Anasazi ruins, a missing anthropologist, a stolen backhoe, people who steal ancient pots on reservation land and human ambition. Chee is pulled into the case by the stolen backhoe, while Leaphorn, now a widower, follows the trail of ancient pots bought and sold.

This novel won the Macavity Award for Best Novel in 1989 and was nominated for two others: The Edgar Award and the Anthony Award. Hillerman has set expectations high, as this novel is an award-winner, yet "Slightly less absorbing than the best Hillermans, but darkly atmospheric and ultimately powerful--with (as usual) effective contrasts among the theological beliefs of rationalist Leaphorn, mystical Chee, and other Navajos." is the comment of one reviewer. Another notes that this "novel of mystery rises above its mere classification-``mystery``- and becomes a fine literary work". In this novel, "it is the sense the author imparts of the sparseness, the spaciousness, the silence, the poverty and the ancient sullen Indian presence in this haunted wild country where the action occurs."

Plot summary

Emma had the brain surgery, but she did not survive it. Joe Leaphorn is grief-stricken; he is on his final leave before quitting the Navajo Tribal Police. BLM agent Thatcher takes him along on a call to talk with a woman accused of stealing Anasazi relics from protected land, a thief of time. Her friends at Chaco National Park called her in as a missing person, and think the officers are there to look for her, finally. Dr. Eleanor Friedman-Bernal is an anthropologist interested in ceramics, who thinks she is close to a major new finding, identifying an individual pot maker by the art on the pots. Leaphorn thinks the anonymous call reporting Dr Friedman-Bernal and her disappearance after a planned weekend away will be connected.

A piece of digging equipment is stolen from the tribal motor pool. Chee traces the thieves. One is known to Slick Nakai, the preacher. Leaphorn and Chee separately show up at Nakai's next revival meeting. Leaphorn learns that Nakai sold pots to Eleanor, while Chee learns about the backhoe thief. Leaphorn notices the same Navajo man helping at the revival that he saw working with Maxie Davis at Chaco. Chee seeks the backhoe, finding it with the trailer at the bottom of a canyon. Then he finds two dead men in the moonlight: Joe B. Nails in the truck cab, and Jimmy Etcitty on the ground. Leaphorn visits Maxie and Randall Elliot to gain more information about Eleanor. She took her camping gear; she was likely out checking her latest discoveries. Leaphorn meets Chee at the murder site, where they connect on their two reasons to be there: the missing anthropologist and the missing motor pool equipment. They find no good tracks of the murderer, but Chee counts the bags. Three were removed from the box, yet only two are filled with pots and pieces. The third bag turns up in Elliot's kitchen trash, filled with Anasazi bones, tagged for one of two important sites. They focus their work on finding the anthropologist.

Leaphorn pursues the trail of the pot Houk sold to an auction house after buying it from Jimmy Etcitty. The buyer in New York City has the form showing the exact place the pot was found, so Leaphorn meets Richard DuMont to get that description. The details of the site are correct but the canyon is on Navajo land. Houk is murdered; in his last few minutes alive he writes a note to tell Leaphorn she is alive. Upon his return, Utah State Police relay this to him and Leaphorn explains the search for the missing anthropologist. Slick Nakai's brother describes the same site to Chee, who then finds the exact locations by tracking where both Elliot and Dr Friedman-Bernal made applications to dig, each for their own research goals. Chee learns that Elliot was not in Washington DC the day Dr Friedman left for her weekend away; instead he rented a helicopter, as he has again done. Chee rents a helicopter and a pilot on the spot.

Leaphorn uses Houk's rubber kayak to find Eleanor. He realizes that Brigham Houk is still alive, living in the wild with the help of his father. Soon after finding Many Ruins Canyon, Leaphorn climbs up the rocks and meets Brigham, who has been expecting him. Brigham shows him the wounded Eleanor, pushed down a cliff by the bad man; she is now unconscious and feverish. Brigham agrees to bring her out for medical help. Then Elliot shows up, confessing his actions, including three murders and one attempted. He reported Eleanor for pothunting to free the site for research sooner due to the supposed thieving. He holds Eleanor's gun to Leaphorn. Brigham gets his bow and kills Elliot with an arrow. Within minutes, the helicopter brings Chee. Leaphorn asks Chee what he saw, which included Elliot's corpse and the glimpse of another man slipping away. Leaphorn says, do not mention any of it, we will talk later. Leaphorn is impressed with Chee's work. Elliot's body will be found after the animals have gotten to it. Leaphorn will not retire; he plans to stay to meet Brigham at the next full moon and tell him of his father's death. He asks Chee to arrange a Blessing Way ceremony for him.

Characters

Joe Leaphorn: Lieutenant in the Navajo Tribal Police, past 50 years old, recently widowed, bent on quitting the police and the reservation to get away from his grief.
Jim Chee: Officert in the Navajo Tribal Police, under Capt. Largo. He is about 30, and has trained to be a hatahalii.
Emma Leaphorn: Late wife of Joe, whose ways are told in Joe's memories of her.
L.B. Thatcher: Bureau of Land Management (BLM) officer who has the warrant to search Eleanor's place in the temporary quarters. He calls her Hyphenated. Also goes with Leaphorn to visit Houk.
Eleanor Friedman-Bernal: Anthropologist who went into Many Ruins Canyon to check her special pots of the late Anasazi period. Jewish woman who married a Puerto Rican man; their marriage ended.
Bo Arnolds: Biologist working on his dissertation about desert lichens.
Maxie Davis: Beautiful and brilliant young woman, close friend to Eleanor, part of archeology team that is sorting the Anasazi sites for future studies. Hard-scrabble life for her from childhood.
Randall Elliot: Anthropologist whose study is Anasazi genetics from bone fragments, teamed with Davis on project to sort Anasazi sites. He comes from old money, the best schools, obsessed with Maxie, who scorns his background. He was a helicopter pilot in Vietnam, and now ambitious and accomplished in physical anthropology.
Bob Luna: U. S. Park Service employee who is director of the Chaco Culture National Historic Park. His wife and children live with him there.
Major Ron Nez: Lt Leaphorn reports to him in the NTP at the Window Rock office.
Captain Largo: Sgt. Chee reports to him in the Shiprock office.
Sgt. Benally: Assigned to the stolen backhoe case by Capt. Largo.
Harrison Houk: Mormon man who lost his family 20 years back to his schizophrenic son's violence. He has no scruples against pot hunting from the Anasazi sites. His ranch is over the San Juan River from the reservation, near the sites, and his name is in Eleanor's appointment book. He is of high stature in his church and in earlier years was an elected official in Utah.
Brigham Houk: Son of Harrison, who killed his mother and siblings in a crime that called in Leaphorn as part of the force. At the time of the crime, it was thought he drowned.
Slick Nakai: Christian Evangelical preacher in the reservation area, a Navajo. His name is in Eleanor's appointment book. He sells pots given to him by those who listen to his preaching.
Reverend Tafoya: Partner to Nakai in the revival meetings, an Apache.
Amos Whistler: Paiute brother to Slick Nakai, who describes the canyon with the special pots to Chee.
Janet Pete: Lawyer for the Navajo legal aid office, who wants Chee to test drive a used car she wants to buy. She met Chee in the summer when she represented one of the men arrested in an investigation. Like Chee, she has a relationship with a Belagana.
Delbert Tsosie: He works at the gas station across from the motor pool yard, and saw the backhoe bandits and their oddly painted car.
Bernie Tso: Owns a garage to repair cars. He checks the car Janet Pete wants to buy, says the odometer was turned way back.
Joe B. Nails: He worked servicing gas company sites, brought his car to Bernie Tso's garage and is one of the two who stole the backhoe to go pothunting.
Jimmy Etcitty: Navajo man who assists Nakai at revivals, works with Maxie, and is partner to Nails.
Richard DuMont: Collector of pottery in New York City.
Detective McGee: Utah State Police for the Houk homicide, first thinks that Dr Friedman-Bernal is the killer.
T. J. Pedwell: staff at Navajo council who finds the records of N. R. 723 site, described by Amos Whistler, where Elliot applied to dig and was turned down, when Chee requests information on how to get to it.

Geography
In his 2011 book Tony Hillerman's Navajoland: Hideouts, Haunts, and Havens in the Joe Leaphorn and Jim Chee Mysteries, author  has listed the following 89 geographical locations, real and fictional, mentioned in A Thief of Time. 

Albuquerque, NM
Aztec, NM
Bisti (Badlands and Trading Post), NM
Bitani Tsosi Wash, NM
Blanco, NM
Blanco Canyon, NM
Blanco Plateau, NM
Blanco Trading Post, NM
Blanding, UT
Bloomfield, NM
Blue Gap. AZ
Bluff, UT
Burnt Water, AZ 
Butler Wash, UT
Cameron, AZ
Cameron Trading Post, AZ
Canyon Largo or Largo Canyon, NM
Largo Creek), NM
Canyon Where Watersprinkler Plays His Flute (fictitious location)
Carrizo Mountains, AZ
Ceniza Mesa, AZ
Chaco Canyon, NM
Chaco Mesa, NM
Chaco Wash, NM
Checkerboard Reservation, NM
Chetro Ketl, NM
Chuska Mountains, NM & AZ
Chuska Valley, NM
Comb Creek, UT
Counselors, NM
Coyote Canyon, NM
Coyote Wash, NM
Crownpoint, NM
Dinnehotso (Trading Post), AZ
Dulce, NM
Durango, CO
Dzil Na O Dith Hle School, NM
Escavada Wash, NM
Escrito, NM
Escrito Spring, NM
Fajada Butte, NM
Farmington, NM
Gallup, NM
Ganado, AZ
Glen Canyon, AZ
Gobernador Canyon, /nm
Gobernador Creek, NM
Gobernador Knob, NM
Gothic Creek
Gothic Creek Canyon.UT
Hogback, NM
Huerfano Mesa, NM
Jicarilla Apache Reservation, NM
Kayenta, AZ
Kin Nasbas, NM
La Jara Wash (and Canyon), NM
La Plata Mountains, CO
Lower Greasewood, AZ
Many Farms, AZ
Many Ruins Canyon (fictitious location)
Mexican Hat, UT
Montezuma Creek, UT
Monument Valley, UT & AZ
Mount Taylor, NM
Nageezi (Trading Post), NM
Navajo Lake, NM
Navajo Mountain, UT & AZ
Nokaito Bench, UT
Nokaito Mesa
Ojo Encino, NM
Red Rock
Red Rock Trading Post, AZ
Rough Rock, AZ
Salmon Ruin, NM
Sand Island, UT
San Juan River, CO, NM, & UT
Shiprock (Community), NM
Shiprock (Pinnacle), NM
Teec Nos Pos, AZ
Tes Nez Iha, AZ
Tsaya (Trading Post), NM
Vaqueros Wash, NM
Watersprinkler Canyon (fictitious location)
White Horse (Lake), NM
White House Ruin, AZ
White Rock, NM
Wijiji, NM
Window Rock, AZ
Ya Tah Hey, NM

Awards

The novel received significant attention when it was released, resulting in a number of award nominations in the "Best Novel" category. A Thief of Time won the 1989 Macavity Award and was nominated for both the 1989 Anthony Award and the 1989 Edgar Award in this category.

Reviews

"One of Tony Hillerman's strengths as a writer is his ability to make what would otherwise appear to be a foreign culture seem familiar".

Kirkus Reviews finds this novel less absorbing than the best Hillermans, but powerful:

Hillerman's two Navajo Tribal Police heroes--middle-aged Lieut. Joe Leaphorn, young Officer Jim Chee--again share the sleuthing, more or less by accident, in another richly somber blend of mystery, socio-theology, psychology, and (this time) anthropology. Leaphorn, traumatized by his wife's recent death, is on leave and plans to quit the force--but he finds himself caught up nonetheless in a local puzzle: what happened to anthropologist Eleanor Friedman-Bernal, who was collecting and studying ancient (ca. 600-1200 A.D.) ceramic pottery of the vanished Anasazi civilization? She's been missing for a month, was on the verge of some breakthrough, and was last seen setting off for an undisclosed wilderness location. Meanwhile, Chee (still brooding on the departure of girlfriend Mary) investigates the theft of a backhoe--and discovers the corpses of two men, shot to death while in the act of digging up (in an illegal area) the very same sort of artifacts that Friedman-Bernal was obsessed with. Are the cases connected? Of course. So Leaphorn (out of curiosity) and Chee (out of grudging respect for Leaphorn) are soon working in tandem. They talk to other anthropologists working in the region. They trace the route by which pots have been illegally dug up, passed to a middleman (a local Born-Again revivalist), and then sold--either to the anthropologist or a New York dealer. Suspicion falls on a former Utah State Senator and rancher--until the old rascal turns up dead himself. And finally each sleuth independently arrives at the solution--which involves an anthropological discovery, a 20-year-old secret, and a harrowing, cliffside confrontation/finale (complete with critical injuries and two helicopters). Slightly less absorbing than the best Hillermans, but darkly atmospheric and ultimately powerful--with (as usual) effective contrasts among the theological beliefs of rationalist Leaphorn, mystical Chee, and other Navajos.

Mark Harris writing in the Chicago Tribune observes that "When a novel of mystery rises above its mere classification-``mystery``- and becomes a fine literary work it offers that dimension of atmosphere Maugham mentions ... In this case, it is the sense the author imparts of the sparseness, the spaciousness, the silence, the poverty and the ancient sullen Indian presence in this haunted wild country where the action occurs." He also says "A Thief of Time, is rich with detection. I marvel at Hillerman`s complex arrangements of clues leading, of course, to that outcome that makes a mystery novel stranger than truth: The mystery is always solved. We learn at the end who did it, and why some of the innocent people who did not do it had been behaving so suspiciously along the way."

Reference in other novels

Spider Woman's Daughter, a novel by Anne Hillerman (Tony Hillerman's daughter), is a sequel to this novel's plot. It brings back not only Leaphorn and Chee but several of the supporting characters from A Thief of Time, with a case that continues from its loose ends. Time has passed, as Chee is married to Bernadette Manualito (introduced in later novels in the series, e.g., The Wailing Wind), who features in solving the case.

Adaptations

In 2004 it was adapted as a TV film by PBS starring Adam Beach as Chee, Wes Studi as Leaphorn and Gary Farmer as Capt. Largo. It also featured Graham Greene, Sheila Tousey, and Peter Fonda. It aired on PBS's Mystery! series.

References

Bibliography

External links
 
 A Thief of Time at the Tony Hillerman Portal
 A Thief of Time at the Tony Hillerman Portal UNM

1988 American novels
Novels by Tony Hillerman
2004 television films
2004 films
Navajo-language films
American television films
American novels adapted into films
Macavity Award-winning works
Harper & Row books
Novels set in Arizona
Novels set in New Mexico
American novels adapted into television shows